Suduhumpola, or Huduhumpola, is a village in Sri Lanka. It lies 1.5 miles from Kandy on the foothills of the Hanthana Mountain Range, within Kandy District, Central Province.

History
Suduhumpola originates with the Suduhumpola Raja Maha Vihara, completed in 1777. Tradition relates that when the king visited the temple, a white cloth was laid for him to step on, hence the name "Suduhumpola" meaning "where the white cloth was laid".

Demographics

See also
List of towns in Central Province, Sri Lanka

References

External links

Populated places in Kandy District